Hübi (also, Gubi) is a village in the Lerik Rayon of Azerbaijan.  The village forms part of the municipality of Yuxarı Velik.

References

See also
 Hubi - Streaming and Download is a Web application by MegaDevs

Populated places in Lerik District